Albert Watson Newton  (23 July 1938 – 30 October 2021) was an Australian media personality. He was a Logie Hall of Fame inductee, quadruple Gold Logie award-winning entertainer and radio, theatre and television personality and presenter. Newton hosted the Logie Awards ceremony on 19 occasions.  
 
Newton was known for his collaborations opposite Graham Kennedy and subsequently Don Lane on their respective variety shows as well as appearances with his wife, singer Patti Newton. Their two children are actor Matthew Newton and TV personality Lauren Newton. 

Newton started his career in radio broadcasting, primarily as an announcer before becoming a star and fixture of Australian television since its inception in 1956, and was considered both an industry pioneer, icon and one of the longest-serving television performers in the world.  

Newton was known for his association with both the Nine Network and Ten Network on numerous variety shows including  In Melbourne Tonight, New Faces, Good Morning Australia, 20 to 1 and game show  Bert's Family Feud.

Early life
Newton was born in Fitzroy, an inner suburb of Melbourne, Victoria, to Joseph (Joe) and Gladys Newton. He had three brothers (Tom, Jack and Bob) and two sisters (Alice and Elizabeth). He was educated at St Joseph's Marist Brothers Roman Catholic college. In his early years he had thoughts of entering the priesthood and remained an active Roman Catholic.

Radio
Newton's first paid radio appearance was as a schoolboy on Melbourne radio station 3XY on 10 June 1952, doing advertisements dressed as a clown with Doug McKenzie, later to become "Zag" in Zig and Zag.

This led to regular appearances on a Saturday morning children's show, in which he worked with disc jockey Stan Rofe and McKenzie.

In May 1954, 3XY employed him as a junior announcer (aged 15); by 1955 he was presenting Melbourne Speaks, a vox pop program recorded on the streets of Melbourne's CBD.

After GTV-9 purchased 3AK in April 1961, all GTV-9 personalities were expected to present programs on 3AK. Graham Kennedy and Newton hosted a two-hour morning program.

He began a morning program on 3UZ in 1976. The Herald and Weekly Times Ltd appointed Newton as general manager of 3DB in 1986, which he combined with on-air appearances until 1988.

Television

Early television career 
Newton began his television career in 1957 at Melbourne's HSV-7, hosting The Late Show. For several years Newton worked with former manager Mason Jarrett whilst trying to find work on numerous television stations.

Newton left HSV-7 and went to GTV-9 in early 1959 to host a daytime television program In Melbourne Today. After appearing in a live commercial on In Melbourne Tonight with his friend Graham Kennedy at Easter 1959, he began to make regular appearances on the show and assumed hosting duties on some episodes. This began a lifelong association with Kennedy.

In 1959–1960 he hosted The Bert Newton Show (later re-titled Hi-Fi Club) on GTV-9, a series aimed at teenagers.

In 1960 and 1961, Newton, along with Graham Kennedy, appeared in the national Graham Kennedy's Channel 9 Show (a one-night-a-week national version of IMT). In January 1962, the show was cancelled and replaced by the similar The Channel 9 Show, hosted by Newton.

Television career 1975 to mid-1992
Newton mainly appeared on the Nine Network in these years.

Good Morning Australia (Network Ten 1992–2005)
From mid-1992 until 2005, Newton appeared on Channel Ten as host of Good Morning Australia

In 1992 Newton moved into daytime television as host of The Morning Show, which soon changed title to Good Morning Australia (GMA) on Network Ten. The show revived Newton's celebrity status and was a continuing success for Ten. GMA was a mix of interviews, music, cooking segments featuring Newton's floor manager Robert Mascara, aka "Belvedere", doing the popular taste tests and innuendo which was primarily ad-libbed. Much of the screen time was dedicated to infomercials. Unusually for television, the show was broadcast live-to-air on Mondays and Tuesdays but for the rest of the week live-to-tape (recorded complete and aired later).

In October 2005, Network Ten announced that the program would be cancelled at the end of the year after a 14-year run. Although Newton was offered ongoing employment at Network Ten, he stated that he would return to the Nine Network in 2006.

Return to the Nine Network (2006–2012)
After finishing on Network Ten's Good Morning Australia in late 2005, Newton returned to the Nine Network in early 2006. He appeared on:
{|class="wikitable"
| Program
| Synopsis
| Reference
|-
| Bert's Family Feud' ||  In 2006, Newton returned to the Nine Network and hosted Bert's Family Feud, a revised version of Family Feud, from 2006 and until it was cancelled on 8 May 2007. || 
|-
| 20 to 1 || From 2006 to 2011, Newton hosted 20 to 1 taking over from Bud Tingwell.
|-
| What a Year || In 2007, Newton hosted the retrospective program What a Year with comedian Julia Zemiro, replacing previous hosts Mike Munro and Megan Gale, which took a light-hearted look at significant events from a chosen year in history
|| 
|-
| Million Dollar Wheel of Fortune || In 2008
Newton appeared as a celebrity contestant alongside TV personality and former Temptation co-host Livinia Nixon and swimmer Dawn Fraser. He won the main game and with $3,235 (including a plasma TV) going to his chosen charity, the International Diabetes Institute || 
|-
| Millionaire Hot Seat || On 14 August 2012, Newton appeared as a celebrity contestant on Millionaire Hot Seat and won $5,000 for the charity Sids & Kids.
|| 
|}
Newton reputedly received a yearly salary of A$800,000 from Nine during this era.

Theatre roles
Newton's stage appearances included Professor Marvel/the Wizard of Oz in The Wizard of Oz, Cogsworth in Beauty and the Beast, Franz Liebkind in The Producers and Max in The Sound of Music.

In October 2008, it was announced that Newton would be taking over the role of The Wizard in the Melbourne production of the musical Wicked, after the sudden death of Rob Guest. He played his first performance on 12 November 2008. The production closed on 9 August 2009 and transferred to Sydney from 12 September 2009. Newton continued to play the role on the national tour, which began in January 2011, opposite Lucy Durack as Glinda, Jemma Rix as Elphaba, David Harris as Fiyero and Maggie Kirkpatrick as Madame Morrible. In 2011 he was part of the Australian cast performing Wicked in Singapore. Altogether, Newton had a three-year run in this show.

In July 2012 Newton joined the Melbourne cast of Annie for a few weeks, taking over the role of President Roosevelt from Alan Jones.

In March 2013 it was announced that Newton would be returning to the stage in producer John Frost's production of Grease The Musical which commenced in August 2013. Newton played disc jockey Vince Fontaine.

Newton played the narrator in the 2015 Australian production of The Rocky Horror Show.

Discography
Studio albums

Singles

Other media
Newton appeared in cameos in several movies including: 
 Doctors & Nurses (1981) as Mr Cody
 Fatty Finn (1980) as Mr Finn
 The Wannabes (2003) as himself
 Remembering Nigel (2007) as The Agent

Newton published an autobiography, Bert!: Bert Newton's Own Story, in 1979.

Logies (awards and nominations)
Newton was an institution of the Logie Awards since the awards since 1959. He was nominated for many Logie Awards and won several:

Three 'Best Compere' awards: 1972, 1973, 1974 (for his role in In Melbourne Tonight and The Graham Kennedy Show)

Logies hosting
Newton also hosted the Logies (1968–1980, 1982, 1984, 1989, 1993 and 2010, and co-host in 2006). He holds the record for both the most Logies hosted and the most Logies hosted in a continuous run. Some notable moments of his hosting include:

 At the 1979 Logies awards Newton said to Muhammad Ali "I like the boy", not knowing that "boy" could be taken as a racial slur. Ali responded "Did he call me Roy?" and members of the audience, including Don Lane, shouted to Newton to say "Yes—Roy!". Newton looked puzzled and later explained to the media that he did not realise that "boy" was used as a racial slur. Ali at least realised Newton's use was unintended and they literally kissed and made up later on. Immediately after the incident, Newton lightened the tension of the incident by saying: "I'll change my name, my religion ... anything", referring to Ali's change of name from Cassius Clay when he adopted Islam in 1964, and proceeding to shake his hands in feigned nervousness. "I like the boy" was a catchphrase Newton had previous used on a commercial playing Colonel Sanders.
 In 1973, American actor Michael Cole, best known for his role in the TV series The Mod Squad, accepted an award while obviously drunk and ended his barely coherent thank-you speech with the word "shit", to which Newton, after a classic pause, merely added 'congratulations'.
 In 2006, after the awards, he had a fall and injured himself. The injury was visible for a number of Bert's Family Feud episodes.

Honours

Newton was appointed a Member of the Order of the British Empire in 1979, for his service to the performing arts.

On 12 June 2006, he was made a Member of the Order of Australia "for service to the entertainment industry as a presenter, actor, comedian, and through support for a range of medical research and charitable organisations".

Newton was the first Melbourne-born King of Moomba in 1978.

A song called "For Bert" was written by GTV-9's musical director Brian Rangott. The lyrics include:
Everything I do,
I do for Bert –
[...]
Some may think Bert's not much,
But they like his gentle touch –
Everything I do,
I do for Bert!

In 1997 Newton was the subject of a This Is Your Life tribute. His wife Patti was honoured with her own tribute in 2001.The Best of Bert Newton was aired in 2002. Channel Nine Salutes Bert Newton was broadcast in early 2004, depicting the career of Newton from his earliest days.

In 2001 he was awarded the Centenary Medal.

Show business awards include a Mo Award (1995), two Television Society of Australia awards (1981 and 1983), three Penguin Citations and three Pater (Professional Excellence in Television and Radio Arts and Sciences) awards for radio.

To celebrate the 50th anniversary of television in Australia, Channel 9 ran a show titled 50 Years, 50 Stars, where they looked back at the top 50 stars of Australian television. Newton was listed as the No. 1 Australian TV star of the past 50 years.

On 1 July 2008, Newton was named Victorian of the Year.

On 23 July 2008, Channel 9 marked Newton's 70th birthday with a one-hour special of This Is Your Life hosted by Mike Munro.
 
In 2018, he was honoured by Australia Post in a series of issued stamps called the Australian Legends series that features stars from Australian television.

Two weeks after his death, on 12 November 2021, Newton was given a Victorian state funeral, conducted at St. Patrick’s Cathedral in Melbourne.

 Personal life 
In 1974, Newton married Patti McGrath with whom he worked on television. The Newtons had two children, son Matthew and daughter Lauren. Matthew Newton is an actor who has appeared in a number of Australian films and television dramas. Lauren Newton married swimmer Matt Welsh.

In 1993, a gambling problem led Newton to near bankruptcy and a $1 million debt.

In 2020, Newton was the subject of an episode of Who Do You Think You Are? which focused primarily on his father and maternal grandparents. The episode first aired on 26 May 2020.

Health and death
In November 2012, Newton underwent quadruple heart bypass surgery, having been admitted to hospital twice in the twelve months prior.

Newton was admitted to Epworth Hospital several times for pneumonia recovery in March and April 2017.

Newton had a toe infection in late 2020 and, due to complications treating this, one of his legs was amputated below the knee in May 2021. He died in Prahran, Victoria, on 30 October 2021, aged 83.
He is interred at the Cedars section of the Springvale Botanical Cemetery, Melbourne.

 Further reading 
 

 

 References 

 External links 

 
 
, 12 October 2003, The Bulletin''
 Back to Bert, The Age, May 30 2002
 Bert Newton and the history of Australian TV, ABC
 Revenge of the second banana, Sydney Morning Herald, July 12, 2004
 AM award

1938 births
2021 deaths
Television personalities from Melbourne
Gold Logie winners
Australian game show hosts
Australian radio personalities
Australian male stage actors
Australian male film actors
Australian Members of the Order of the British Empire
Members of the Order of Australia
Recipients of the Centenary Medal
Australian Roman Catholics
Radio personalities from Melbourne
Australian amputees
People from Fitzroy, Victoria